Padilha ( or ) is a Portuguese language surname. Notable people with the name include:

Adriano Padilha Nascimento (born 1980), Brazilian footballer
Alexandre Padilha (born 1971), Brazilian politician
Eliseu Padilha (born 1945), Brazilian politician
Janea Padilha, beautician, entrepreneur and author, best known for popularizing Brazilian bikini waxing
Joel Bertoti Padilha (born 1980), Brazilian footballer
José Padilha (born 1967), Brazilian film director, producer and screenwriter
Marcos Danilo Padilha (1985–2016), Brazilian footballer
Sylvio de Magalhães Padilha (1909–2002), Brazilian athlete
Tarcísio Padilha, Brazilian philosopher

See also 
Padilla (surname), Spanish-language variant

Portuguese-language surnames